Fjeldeventyret (The Mountain Story) is a Norwegian film from 1927 based on Henrik Anker Bjerregaard's play of the same name from 1824. The film is a romantic drama. It was directed by Leif Sinding.

Plot
Mons Østmoe wants to move up in the world by marrying Marie, the daughter of his uncle the bailiff, and becoming the village's new bailiff. He mistakenly arrests three students in the belief that they are wanted robbers. The three students surrender in the hope that the trial will become a farce. It turns out that one of those arrested, Albek, is Marie's secret fiancé and the judge's nephew. To avoid scandal, the bailiff allows Albek to marry his daughter. Mons must therefore settle for the bailiff's niece Ragnhild.

Cast

 Ulf Selmer as Østmoe, the bailiff
 Henny Geermann as Marie Østmoe, the bailiff's daughter 
 Anna-Brita Ryding as Ragnhild, the bailiff's niece 
 Josef Sjøgren as Mons Østmoe, the deputy bailiff 
 Haakon Hjelde as Wilhelm, a student 
 Per Kvist as Ole Finberg, a student 
 Henry Gleditsch as Hansen, a student 
 Ellen Sinding as Aagot, a mountain girl
 David Knudsen as the district judge
 Sæbjørn Buttedahl as Jon 
 Arthur Barking as Ole Sørbraaten 
 Jakob Amundsen as Mads

References

External links
 
 Fjeldeventyret at the National Library of Norway

1927 films
Norwegian silent feature films
Norwegian black-and-white films
Norwegian drama films
1927 drama films
Silent drama films